Agnetha Fältskog is the debut studio album by Swedish pop singer and future ABBA member Agnetha Fältskog. It was released in Sweden in early 1968 through Cupol Records.

Album information
Fältskog had been singing with the local Swedish "dansband" Bengt Engharts in Jönköping for quite a while when the group decided to send a tape of demos to Cupol Records in autumn of 1967. Singer, producer and A & R man Little Gerhard (né Karl-Gerhard Lundqvist) listened to the tape which included Fältskog's song "Jag var så kär". Lundqvist was so impressed with the song and Fältskog's voice that he called her at the car firm where she was working at the time and offered her a recording contract, only as a solo singer, without the band.
 
Eventually, Fältskog's first recording session took place on 16 October 1967, at Philips Studio in Stockholm. This recording session produced four songs, which would all end up on her first album: "Jag var så kär" and "Utan dej mitt liv går vidare" (both composed by Agnetha herself) as well as "Följ med mig" and "Slutet gott, allting gott". "Jag var så kär" and "Följ med mig" were eventually be released as Fältskog's debut single (CUPOL CS 45-211) in November 1967, the latter up-tempo track being its A-side. 
But it was Fältskog's self-penned tear-jerker "Jag var så kär" which became her first entry and also number three on the all-important radio chart Svensktoppen in January 1968. After this success and with selling more than 80,000 copies, the single topped Sweden's official sales chart at that time, Kvällstoppen. 
After the following success of the tracks "Utan dej mitt liv går vidare", "Allting har förändrat sig", "Den jag väntat på" and "Snövit och de sju dvärgarna", most of them composed by Fältskog herself, Cupol released her debut album in the spring of 1968, containing all tracks previously issued on these singles as well as a few new recordings.

She wrote "Försonade" and submitted it to Melodifestivalen (Swedish Eurovision heat) for singer Gunnar Wiklund, but it was rejected. The song could also recently be heard in the film Låt den rätte komma in (Let the Right One In) in the scene where Eli plays it on a tape recorder for Oskar.

The album has since been re-issued both on CD and iTunes.

Track listing

Singles
Out of the 12 tracks recorded for Agnetha Fältskog's debut studio album, a total of ten songs were released as either single a-side or b-side in 1967 and 1968. Only two of them charted on the official Swedish sales chart at that time, Kvällstoppen.
Also included in the following list is Agnetha's duet single with Jörgen Edman, which was released in 1968 but did not appear on the original album.

Svensktoppen
Throughout her pre-ABBA solo career, Fältskog's success was mostly visible by looking at her entries in the famous Swedish Svensktoppen chart. This chart is not based on sales figures but compiled by a jury instead. A total of five songs of hers made that hitlist in 1968. It is interesting to mention that mostly her B-sides eventually made the Svensktoppen top 10.

Sources
 Booklet, Agnetha Fältskog: Agnetha Fältskog De Första Åren
 Bright Lights Dark Shadows – The Real Story of ABBA by Carl Magnus Palm

References

1968 debut albums
Agnetha Fältskog albums
Swedish-language albums